Simulations Publications, Inc. (SPI) was an American publisher of board wargames and related magazines, particularly its flagship Strategy & Tactics, in the 1970s and early 1980s. It produced an enormous number of games and introduced innovative practices, changing the course of the wargaming hobby in its bid to take control of the hobby away from then-dominant Avalon Hill. SPI ran out of cash in early 1982 when TSR called in a loan secured by SPI's assets. TSR began selling SPI's inventory in 1982, but later acquired the company's trademarks and copyrights in 1983 and continued a form of the operation until 1987.

History

Origin and early years 
Jim Dunnigan had been introduced to Avalon Hill wargames while serving in the U.S. Army in Korea. Upon his return to civilian life in 1964, Dunnigan began to contribute articles to Avalon Hill's house publication The General and independent wargaming magazine Strategy & Tactics. In one of his contributions to The General, Dunnigan criticized what he saw as a lack of historical accuracy in Avalon Hill's 1965 release, Battle of the Bulge. Thomas Shaw, at the time in charge of Avalon Hill, asked Dunnigan to design and submit his own wargame. The result was Jutland, published by Avalon Hill in 1967. Two years later, after designing 1914 for Avalon Hill, Dunnigan struck out on his own after concluding there must be a "more effective way to publish games." He quickly gathered a staff of like-minded designers, including Al Nofi and Redmond A. Simonsen. Dunnigan acquired Strategy & Tactics, which had been in financial trouble, from its founder Christopher Wagner. However, SPI quickly proved that it was primarily a game publisher rather than a magazine publisher; not only did it start to publish a variety of wargames, but each issue of Strategy & Tactics included a complete wargame, comprising a map, rule book and a sheet of die-cut counters.

In SPI's first two or three years, it embarked upon an expensive advertising campaign, including — but not limited to — full page advertisements in Scientific American magazine. New subscribers received free copies of its most successful game, Napoleon At Waterloo, an "easy to play" pocket-sized game with a foldout map and 78 pieces punched from card stock. This advertising campaign led to a much larger subscriber base and SPI came to be seen as a serious competitor to Avalon Hill, the company that had founded the board wargaming hobby.

While S&T had started as a wargaming 'fanzine', under SPI it became more of a military history magazine that included a wargame. So in 1972, SPI started Moves as a house organ that talked about current and future SPI games, including a fair amount of information on SPI's game design process.

In 1974, SPI started to ship some of their wargames games to J.D. Bardsley in the UK, who acted as a sales representative using the name SP/UK. Bardsley sold the games either via mail order or face to face at games conventions. Sales increased rapidly, and by March 1976, SP/UK had sold 25,000 units. To handle the increased sales, SPI formed a formal British subsidiary, Simpubs Ltd. in June 1976. Simpubs immediately created the bi-monthly periodical Phoenix with J.D. Bardsley as managing editor.

Commercial success and growth 
Like many new wargame companies in the early '70s, early SPI games left a lot to be desired physically. A typical early game came in an envelope with only a one-color map and one large folded sheet for the rules. However, SPI quickly set about improving the physical quality of the components with better printing and boxes under the guidance of Art Director Redmond A. Simonsen. In 1973, they introduced a flat plastic box that was molded to be a counter storage tray with a clear cover. The actual cover of the game was a printed sheet that backed the clear plastic. This allowed SPI to produce the boxes in bulk, as they were identical for each game, the printed sheet provided the cover and could be printed with all the other components of the game. This system became the hallmark of SPI games, and was later emulated by Simulations Canada, whose early games utilized a smaller storage tray, with the cover of the rules booklet doubling as the cover sheet.

SPI used a unique feedback system, polling the readers of S&T as to which games they would be interested in seeing (and buying). This market research gave SPI a greater likelihood of developing successful games.

Although starting with small to medium size wargames, SPI found an insatiable market, with subscribers clamoring for an ever-wider range of wargames, including historical simulations that were daunting in their scope and complexity, such as War in the East, War in the Pacific, The Next War, Terrible Swift Sword and Campaign for North Africa, each with several maps, thousands of counters and multiple rule books. Campaign for North Africa was an ultra-detailed and virtually unplayable game, covering the entire North African campaign down to the level of individual fighter pilot ratings and supply trucks. At the other end of the spectrum, SPI created a new series of smaller games called 'folio' games, often created in groups of four and sold both individually and together as a "Quadrigame". Each of the four component games included two rules booklets, one with rules common to all four games, and the other with rules exclusive to the individual game; the component games would each cover a different battle from the same war, era, or genre.

The scale of the games ranged from the strategic to the operational and down to the tactical level. Three of the more popular games were tactical: Sniper!, FireFight and Air War, all of which were later reprinted by TSR.

SPI started out publishing games on historical subjects, but soon started producing games that were more hypothetical (e.g. World War III, Invasion: America), and a little later, also tackled fantasy and science fiction subjects, such as Starforce: Alpha Centauri and War of the Ring (a Lord of the Rings game), eventually starting a new magazine, Ares which, like S&T, included a new science fiction or fantasy game in each issue. At this time, the company also attempted to tap into the growing popularity of role-playing games, with DragonQuest and Universe, responses to Dungeons & Dragons and Traveller respectively; the term "Adventure Gaming" also replaced "Wargaming" in company advertising.

Demise and asset acquisition by TSR 
In an attempt to expand its customer base, SPI entered into a much-publicized arrangement with Lorimar Productions to produce the Dallas role-playing game based on the soap opera Dallas in 1980. The game proved to be an infamous failure, and Simonsen later remarked that the 80,000 copies printed were 79,999 too many.

SPI had shopped for venture capital providers to take advantage of the perceived expansion of the gaming market in the late 1970s. When the expansion did not deliver the expected higher profits, only higher sales, the money needed to be returned. First efforts led to discussions with Avalon Hill to merge with or acquire SPI, but that did not materialize, partially due to the increasing losses in cash for SPI thanks to the increases in costs from inflation and the decreases in revenue. AH did purchase five of SPI's titles, which helped with operational costs. However, more money was needed.

SPI negotiated a promissory note loan (at the time mentioned as $225,000 but here listed as $400,000 from TSR (the publishers of Dungeons & Dragons). The note was guaranteed by SPI's assets. SPI used the cash to pay their venture capitalists, and were broke but happy. However, less than two weeks later, TSR called in the note.  SPI, with no cash available and no options to get the cash, were forced to give over their inventory stock to TSR in early 1982, and were effectively out of business. TSR originally claimed they acquired SPI, but as that would mean they also would be responsible for their debts, quickly changed that statement. Thus, SPI's assets—but not its debts and liabilities—were acquired by TSR in 1983.  TSR refused to honor SPI subscriptions and used the "assets, not liabilities" agreement to ignore SPI's debts.  This policy alienated many of TSR's potential customers.

Aftermath 
In an effort to make money from the SPI intellectual properties that they now owned, TSR released several titles that were ready for publication but had been stranded by a lack of money for printing, such as Battle Over Britain and Richard Berg's latest contribution to the Great Battles of the American Civil War series, A Gleam of Bayonets: The Battle of Antietam. TSR also reboxed and republished several popular SPI titles from the mid-1970s under the TSR logo, including Air War, Blue & Gray: Four American Civil War Battles, and Napoleon's Last Battles. But TSR halted all current SPI game development, and most SPI game designers resigned and moved to rival company Avalon Hill, lured by the formation of a subsidiary specifically for them called Victory Games.

TSR soon learned that one reason for SPI's demise was the collapse of the wargame market in the early 1980s. As a result, rather than becoming a major player in the wargame market, TSR published fewer and fewer wargames. Eventually TSR discontinued all the SPI magazines except for Strategy & Tactics. In 1987, TSR sold the rights to S&T to 3W.

Decision Games, a California company founded in 1988, now has the rights to most of the SPI backlist.

Awards 
 Charles S. Roberts Award, Best Professional Magazine of 1974, 1975, 1976, and 1977: Strategy & Tactics 
 Charles S. Roberts Award, All Time Best Fantasy Board Game of 1977: War of the Ring
 Charles S. Roberts Award, Best 20th Century Game of 1978: To the Green Fields Beyond
 Charles S. Roberts Award, Best 20th Century Game of 1979: City-Fight
 Charles S. Roberts Award: Best Fantasy or Science Fiction Game of 1979: The Creature That Ate Sheboygan
 H. G. Wells Award, Best Roleplaying Rules of 1979: Commando
 Charles S. Roberts Award, Best Pre-20th Century Boardgame of 1980: Empires of the Middle Ages
 H. G. Wells Award: Best Roleplaying Rules of 1980: DragonQuest

See also 
 List of SPI games
 Operational Studies Group
 Victory Games

Bibliography 
 1977: Wargame Design: The History, Production, and Use of Conflict Simulation Games
 1977: War in the East: The Russo-German Conflict 1941–45

References

External links 
 SPI Compendium by Greg Costikyan (lists games, magazine contents, etc.)
 A Farewell to Hexes by Greg Costikyan

1969 establishments in New York City
1982 disestablishments in New York (state)
American companies established in 1969
American companies disestablished in 1982
Publishing companies established in 1969
Publishing companies disestablished in 1982
Board game publishing companies
Defunct companies based in New York City
Role-playing game publishing companies
Wargame companies